A Sundress is a casual woman's dress found in Western cultures in the 20th and 21st centuries.   

Sundress may also refer to:
 Sundress, a 2006 EP by Ben Kwellen, containing the song "Sundress"
 "Sundress", a 2018 song by ASAP Rocky
 "Sundress", a 2018 song by DRAM on the EP That's a Girls Name 
 "Sundress", a 1992 song by the band Hum on the album Electra 2000